Fudbalski Centar Vujadin Boškov is the training facility of Serbian professional football club FK Vojvodina. The sports complex was named after Vujadin Boškov, a former player and successful trainer of FK Vojvodina.

History
In the early 1970s on the edge of Novi Sad and the road to Veternik, a sport and training center was built to be the home of football club FK Vojvodina. 

In 2006 the club reconstructed the complex along with the stadium. In 2009 the training facility was expanded.

Facilities 

The center has 85,000 m2 of sports facilities and 2,000 m2 of enclosed space. It hosts six courts. One court offers artificial grass. Two courts are surrounded by bleachers, and the main allows matches and training at night.

The main building houses two press centers for interviews. 

Regarding functionality, architectural solutions, modern equipment and building materials used, this center is one of the most modern training camps in South Eastern Europe.

Notables 
FK Vojvodina has developed renowned professional footballers such as Miloš Krasić, Gojko Kačar, Milan Stepanov, Srđan Bajčetić (retired), Dušan Tadić, Željko Brkić, Danijel Aleksić, Slobodan Medojević, Aleksandar Katai, Goran Šaula, Damir Stojak and former Barnsley player Jovo Bosančić.

References

External links
 FC Vujadin Boškov 
 

FK Vojvodina
Vujadin Boškov
Sports venues completed in the 1970s
1970s establishments in Serbia